Higor Silva Alves (born February 23, 1994) is a Brazilian long jumper. A member of the host nation's track and field squad at the 2016 Summer Olympics, Alves registered his best jump at 8.19 m from the Brazilian Championships in São Paulo a month before the Games.

Alves competed for the host nation Brazil in the men's long jump at the 2016 Summer Olympics in Rio de Janeiro. Leading up to his maiden Games, he obtained a mark of 8.19 m to successfully earn the national title and clear the IAAF Olympic entry standard (8.15) by four centimetres. In the qualifying phase, Alves spanned his opening legal jump at 7.59 m, but fouled in the succeeding two attempts that saw him tumble down the leaderboard, finishing in twenty-eighth place from a field of thirty-two athletes.

Competition record

References

External links
 

1994 births
Living people
People from Carapicuíba
Brazilian male long jumpers
World Athletics Championships athletes for Brazil
Athletes (track and field) at the 2015 Pan American Games
Athletes (track and field) at the 2016 Summer Olympics
Olympic athletes of Brazil
Pan American Games athletes for Brazil
Sportspeople from São Paulo (state)
21st-century Brazilian people